Spring Hollow Township is an inactive township in Laclede County, in the U.S. state of Missouri.

Spring Hollow Township was established in 1874, taking its name from a valley of the same name within its borders.

References

Townships in Missouri
Townships in Laclede County, Missouri